Maclean, Queensland may refer to two localities in Logan City, Queensland, Australia:

North Maclean, Queensland
South Maclean, Queensland

See also 
Maclean, New South Wales